Mani Hussaini {{Arabic:مانی حسینی}}; (born 25 October 1987) is a Kurdish-Norwegian politician who was the leader of the Workers' Youth League (AUF) from 19 October 2014 until 21 October 2018.

Born in a Kurdish family in Syria, Hussaini came to Norway at the age of twelve when his parents applied for asylum. His father, an agriculture engineer, was active in the Kurdistan Democratic Party of Syria. The family first sought asylum in Sweden which due to the Dublin Regulation planned to return them to Greece where they first had arrived. The family then fled to Norway in 1999, where they were granted the right to stay in 2001 and settled in Jessheim.

Hussaini became a member of AUF in 2006 and later became leader of the Akershus chapter. In the 2011 local elections, he was elected to the Ullensaker municipality council and Akershus county council for the Labour party. He was elected as deputy representative to the Parliament of Norway from Akershus for the terms 2013–2017 and 2017–2021.

In September 2014, AUF's electoral committee nominated him to become the new leader of AUF after Eskil Pedersen. The nomination led to harassing comments based on Hussaini's ethnic background on various internet sites  and a person who suggested the electoral committee should be executed was reported to the police. On 19 October, Hussaini was unanimously elected new leader at the league's congress in Oslo. He has named environment and economic equality as two prime political issues.

He studies innovation and technology at the University of Oslo.

References 

1987 births
Living people
People from Jessheim
Labour Party (Norway) politicians
Akershus politicians
Deputy members of the Storting
Syrian Kurdish people
Syrian refugees
Refugees in Norway
Syrian emigrants to Norway
University of Oslo alumni